Stanisław Baliński (2 August 1898 in Warsaw – 12 November 1984 in London) was a Polish poet, writer and diplomat.

References

1898 births
1984 deaths
Writers from Warsaw
20th-century Polish poets